Parly is a commune in the Yonne department in north-central France.

Parly may also refer to:
 Parliament nicknamed "parly"
 A "parly" train, or parliamentary train in the UK
 Parly (surname), and a list of people with that name
 Parly P. Pratt (1807–1857), Mormon leader
 Parly, a fictional character from the play Sir Harry Wildair
 Parly, a fictional character from the play The Constant Couple

See also

 Parlay (disambiguation)
 Parley (disambiguation)
 Parler (disambiguation)
 Parle (disambiguation)